This is a list of the National Register of Historic Places listings in Martin County, Texas.

This is intended to be a complete list of properties and districts listed on the National Register of Historic Places in Martin County, Texas. There is one property listed on the National Register in the county. This property is also a Recorded Texas Historic Landmark.

Current listings

The locations of National Register properties may be seen in a mapping service provided.

|}

See also

National Register of Historic Places listings in Texas
Recorded Texas Historic Landmarks in Martin County

References
 

Martin County, Texas
Martin County
Buildings and structures in Martin County, Texas